Executive Order 11063 was signed by President John F. Kennedy on November 20, 1962.  This Order "prohibits discrimination in the sale, leasing, rental, or other disposition of properties and facilities owned or operated by the federal government or provided with federal funds." This order thereby banned segregation in federally funded housing.

References

External links
Full text of Executive Order 11063

11063
Civil rights movement
20th-century military history of the United States
1962 in American law
1962 in American politics